Marija Aušrinė Pavilionienė (born 6 April 1944 in Kaunas, Lithuania) is a Lithuanian philologist, professor, human rights activist, feminist writer and politician. She had been a member of Seimas from 2004 to 2008 as a member of Liberal Democratic Party of Lithuania and since 2009 as a member of Social Democratic Party of Lithuania.

Marija Aušrinė was born in the family of actors Vladas Fedotas-Sipavičius and Jadvyga Ramanauskaitė and finished the 23rd Vilnius School. In 1967 she graduated from Vilnius State University, continuing her studies in American literature problems. In 1977 she maintained a thesis for a PhD degree in Philology in Taras Shevchenko National University of Kyiv.

Her husband Rolandas Pavilionis was a Member of the European Parliament and had been a dean of Vilnius University from 1990 to 2000. The two had two sons, one of whom is an ambassador to the United States.

Political activism and scientific work 
Marija Aušrinė Pavilionienė is one of the most well-known LGBT rights activists in Lithuania, the chairman of Ad Hoc Group of Seimas Members for Equality. She is also a prominent feminist thinker and occasionally publishes articles about gender issues.

Pavilionienė was a member of the Groups of Seimas concerning human rights in Tibet and Belarus while in her first term in Seimas.

Bibliography 

 The Universal Literature of the 20th century. (XX amžiaus visuotinė literatūra). Kaunas: Šviesa, 1992;
 Western Literature of the 20th century. (XX a. Vakarų literatūra) Vilnius: Vilnius University, 1994–1995;
 Feminism and Literature (Feminizmas ir literatūra). Vilnius: Vilnius University, 1996;
 The Drama of Genders (Lyčių drama). Vilnius: Vilnius University, 1998;
 Romanticism in Western Literature (Romantizmas Vakarų literatūroje). Vilnius: Vilnius University, 2000;
 The Performances of Life and Theatre: Western Drama of the 20th Century (Gyvenimo ir teatro vaidinimai: XX amžiaus Vakarų drama). Vilnius: Charibdė, 2004;
 Expectancies and Disappointment (Viltys ir nusivylimai). 2011

References 

1944 births
Living people
Lithuanian philologists
Women philologists
Lithuanian LGBT rights activists
Politicians from Kaunas
Women members of the Seimas
Lithuanian feminists
21st-century Lithuanian politicians
21st-century Lithuanian women politicians
Writers from Kaunas
Lithuanian people of Russian descent
Members of the Seimas